David Francis Barrow (Athens, Georgia, November 14, 1888 – February 4, 1970) was an American mathematician who introduced Barrow's inequality in 1937.

Barrow's father, David Crenshaw Barrow Jr., was also a mathematician, and served as chancellor of the University of Georgia from 1906 to 1925. His son, David F. Barrow, did his undergraduate studies at the University of Georgia and then studied at Harvard University, where he earned his Ph.D. in 1913. After a year abroad, he taught for two years at the University of Texas, and then at the Sheffield Scientific School. After a brief stint in the U.S. armed services, he joined the faculty of his father's university in 1920. He became a full professor in 1923, and chaired the mathematics department in 1944–1945.

Publications

 "Can a robot calculate the table of logarithms?". In: The American Mathematical Monthly, Volume 49, No. 10 (Dec., 1942), pp. 671–673 (JSTOR)

References

External links
Generations Chart for Hugh W. Barrow and Family

1888 births
1970 deaths
20th-century American mathematicians
University of Georgia alumni
Harvard University alumni
University of Georgia faculty
University of Texas faculty
Geometers
People from Athens, Georgia